Anna Allen Martín (born 28 June 1977) is a Spanish actress.

Early life and career 
Allen is known for her roles in television series such as Cuéntame cómo pasó, Acusados, and Paquita Salas. Allen grew up in Barcelona, and later on she moved to Madrid at the age of 23 to complete her education.

Controversy 
In early 2015, a picture posted by Allen's accounts on social media of herself attending the Oscars ceremony that year was revealed as fake, and as a result, it was exposed that she had claimed certain roles in upcoming projects that she never played. Her fake projects included roles in The Big Bang Theory, White Collar and Versailles.

Filmography

Feature films 
 The Perfect Summer (2013)

Short films 
 Vertices
 A Trip To Paradise
 Two Fingers
 To Those Who scream / Sarah's loud
 Inertial Love
 Norberto

Television

Theater 
 Antígona del siglo XXI (2011)
 Faros de color y otros (Ale Massi y Javier Daulte, Teatro El Callejón, Buenos Aires)
 Romeo y Julieta
 Shakespeare is coming (Jofre Martín, Sala La Flèche d\'Or, París)
 Vías paralelas (Jesús Roche, Teatro de L\'exaimple)
 Exit

References

External links 
 

20th-century Spanish actresses
1977 births
Spanish film actresses
Spanish television actresses
Living people
21st-century Spanish actresses